William Coventre (fl. 1397) was an English politician.

Coventre was a Member of Parliament for Melcombe Regis in September 1397.

References

Year of birth missing
Year of death missing
Members of the Parliament of England (pre-1707) for Melcombe Regis
14th-century births
English MPs September 1397